St. Lucie Inlet Preserve State Park is a Florida State Park east of Port Salerno on the northern end of Jupiter Island  and is accessible only by boat. Activities include snorkeling and scuba diving, swimming, sunbathing, fishing, and picnicking and wildlife viewing.

Among the wildlife of the park are migratory birds such as the Peregrine falcon, Broad-winged hawk and the American kestrel, as well as bobcats, otters, raccoons.

Hours
Florida state parks are open between 8 a.m. and sundown every day of the year (including holidays).

External links
 St. Lucie Inlet Preserve State Park at Florida State Parks
 St. Lucie Inlet State Preserve at Wildernet

Parks in Martin County, Florida
State parks of Florida
Beaches of Martin County, Florida
Beaches of Florida